Zajc is a surname. Notable people with the surname include:

Dane Zajc (1929–2005), Slovene poet
Gorazd Zajc (born 1987), Slovenian footballer
Ivan Zajc (1832–1914), Croatian composer, conductor, director and teacher
Miha Zajc (born 1994), Slovenian footballer
Timi Zajc (born 2000), Slovenian ski jumper
Tina Zajc (born 1983), Slovenian beauty queen
William Allen Zajc, American physicist

See also
Seitz (surname)
Zajac

Slovene-language surnames